The Autumn League is a one-man metal project that originated in 2012 in Sydney, Australia. The project is signed to Rottweiler Records and SkyBurnsBlack Records.

Background
The Autumn League started as a project in 2012 with founder PJ Somers aka Matt Hudson. The Autumn League has a debut album, Concept of Irony and a single, "Lament". As of 2019, the band is currently active and are working on a new release, but are not putting a timetable on a release date.

Discography
Studio albums
Concept of Irony (2014; Rottweiler Records/SkyBurnsBlack Records)

Single
"Lament" (2015)

References

Rottweiler Records artists
Musical groups established in 2012
2012 establishments in Australia